Classic House is a compilation album by English DJ Pete Tong with Jules Buckley and the Heritage Orchestra, released on 25 November 2016. It reached number 1 on the UK Albums Chart, marking Tong's first ever number 1 album.

Track listing

Charts and certifications

Weekly charts

Year-end charts

Certifications

References

2016 compilation albums
Universal Music Group compilation albums